Hafız Pasha may refer to:

 Hadım Hafız Ahmed Pasha (died 1613), Ottoman governor of Egypt (1590–94)
 Hafız Ahmed Pasha (1564–1632), Ottoman grand vizier (1625–26, 1631–32)
 Mustafa Hafiz Pasha (died 1805), Ottoman statesman and soldier, fought and died during battle of Ivankovac
 Mehmed Hafiz Pasha (fl. 1892), Ottoman governor of Basra (1892)
 Hafiz Mehmed Pasha, the Circassian (died 1866), Ottoman soldier and statesman
 Hafiz Mehmed Pasha, Ottoman governor of Kosovo (1894–99)
 Hafuz Pasha (fl. 1876–1900), Ottoman governor of Skopje
 Hafiz Hakki Pasha (1878–1915), Ottoman general
 Hafeez A. Pasha, Pakistani economist

See also
 Hafiz (disambiguation)
 Pasha, a higher rank in the Ottoman Empire political and military system, typically granted to governors, generals, dignitaries and others